The fauna of Turkey is abundant and very varied. The wildlife of Turkey includes a great diversity of plants and animals, each suited to its own particular habitat, as it is a large country with many geographic and climatic regions  About 1500 species of vertebrates have been recorded in the country and around 19,000 species of invertebrate. The country acts as a crossroads with links to Europe, Asia, and the Near East, and many birds use the country as a staging post during migration.

Overview
Turkey has a large range of habitat types and the diversity of its fauna is very great. There are nearly 1,500 species of vertebrate recorded of which over 100 species, mostly fish, are endemic. The country is on two major routes used by migratory birds which swells the numbers in spring and autumn. The invertebrates are also very diverse, with about 19,000 species being recorded including 4,000 endemics.

Invertebrates

Molluscs

Insects

There are over 250 species of ant in Turkey, 48 of which are endemic.

Arachnids

Vertebrates

Amphibians

Twenty-three species are endemic to Turkey.

Reptiles

Twenty-three species are endemic to Turkey.

Birds

Mammals 

Eight species are endemic to Turkey. Many species have declined in numbers, for example chamois, gazelle and mouflon, with shortage of staff to protect them claimed to be a factor. DNA of 15 endangered large mammals will be stored.

Fish

One hundred sixty-one species of freshwater fish are endemic to Turkey.

Conservation
Conservation action plans for 100 species are due to be completed by the end of 2019.

Endangered species
Mediterranean monk seal (Critically endangered) – less than 500 individuals all around the world
Northern bald ibis (Critically endangered) – main groups live in Morocco and Turkey
Asia Minor spiny mouse (Critically endangered)
Rana holtzi (Toros frog; Critically endangered) – endemic to Turkey
Pseudophoxinus maeandricus (Sandıklı spring minnow; Critically endangered) – known from a single stream
Anatolian leopard (Endangered) 
White-headed duck (Endangered)
Red-breasted goose (Endangered)
Loggerhead sea turtle (Endangered)
Great bustard (Vulnerable)
Dalmatian pelican (Vulnerable)
Lesser kestrel (Vulnerable)
Egyptian vulture (Vulnerable)
Wild goat (Vulnerable)
Greater spotted eagle (Vulnerable)
Eastern imperial eagle (Vulnerable)
Saker falcon (Vulnerable)

Locally extinct fauna
The following species have reportedly become extinct in Turkey, at least since the 20th century:
African darter, due to the drying up of Lake Amik
Asiatic lion
Caspian tiger, the last known individual was shot in 1974 in Hakkari Province
Küre and Kaçkar Mountains National Parks have been suggested for rewilding.

See also 

 Fauna of Europe
 Fauna of Asia

References

External links 
National Biodiversity Database
Fauna Turkey

 
Biota of Turkey